Apple IMC is an independent company given the title of "Independent Marketing Company" authorised to be a distributor for the computer manufacturer Apple Inc.

Presence
A number of countries have an Apple IMC including Poland, Romania, Russia, South Africa, Turkey and UAE.

References

Distributors
Apple Inc. subsidiaries